Ben Weprin (June 28, 1978) is the founder and CEO of AJ Capital Partners, a private real estate company based in Nashville. Weprin and AJ Capital founded Graduate Hotels in 2014.

Early life and education
Weprin was born and raised in Oakwood, Ohio, a Dayton, Ohio suburb. He graduated from the University of Tennessee. Mr. Weprin completed his MBA at Kellogg School of Management.

Career
In 2008, Weprin founded AJ Capital Partners. In Chicago, he restored the Hotel Lincoln, Chicago Athletic Association, Soho House and Thompson Chicago. The current portfolio includes projects throughout Chicago, as well as the Pontchartrain Hotel in New Orleans and the Thompson Nashville in Nashville’s Gulch neighborhood. He founded Graduate Hotels in 2014. Recent projects underway include The Armory in San Francisco; May Hosiery and Nashville Warehouse Company in Nashville, as well as the Rusacks Hotel overlooking the Old Course in St. Andrews, Scotland, which opened in July 2021.

Awards
 Inc. (magazine) 2017 Design Awards, Best Interior Design - Graduate Hotels
 Fast Company The Most Innovative Companies of 2016 – AJ Capital Partners
 Urban Land Institute Chicago’s Catalytic Redevelopment – Chicago Athletic Association
 James Beard Foundation Outstanding Restaurant Design Finalist – Cherry Circle Room – Chicago Athletic Association
 James Beard Foundation Outstanding Restaurant Design Finalist – Cindy’s – Chicago Athletic Association
 National Trust for Historic Preservation Driehaus Preservation Award – Chicago Athletic Association

References

External links 
 www.ajcpt.com
 www.graduatehotels.com

Living people
1978 births
American chief executives
Businesspeople from Dayton, Ohio
University of Tennessee alumni
Northwestern University alumni